Metal Hurlant is the eighth studio album by the band Misanthrope. It is a double full-length album, with the second incorporating some instrumental and English versions of songs from the first.

Track listing

Disque 1

Disque 2

References

Misanthrope (band) albums
2005 albums